
In television programming, the situation comedy or sitcom may be recorded using either a multiple-camera setup or a single-camera setup. Single-camera sitcoms are often notable for their enhanced visual style, use of real-world filming locations and in recent years, for not having a laugh track (most single-camera sitcoms from the 1960s contained a laugh track). Some, but not all, single-camera comedy series may also be classified as comedy-drama, a genre which blends comedic and dramatic elements. The distinction between a sitcom and a comedy-drama series is based on the show's content, not its form.

See also
List of sitcoms
Laugh track
List of comedy television series
Must See TV

Bibliography
Situation Comedy Bibliography (via UC Berkeley)

Further reading

Lewisohn, Mark (2003) Radio Times' Guide to TV Comedy. 2nd Ed. Revised – BBC Consumer Publishing. . Provides details of every comedy show ever seen on British television, including imports.

References

External links
British Sitcom Guide
Multicamera shows get no respect Variety, January 29, 2009

Single-camera